Richard Harvey Cain (April 12, 1825 – January 18, 1887) was a minister, abolitionist, and United States Representative from South Carolina from 1873 to 1875 and 1877 to 1879. After the American Civil War, he was appointed by Bishop Daniel Payne as a missionary of the African Methodist Episcopal Church in South Carolina. He also was one of the founders of Lincolnville, South Carolina.

Early life and education
Cain was born to a black father and a Cherokee mother in Greenbrier County, Virginia, which is now in West Virginia. He was raised in Gallipolis, Ohio, a free state where he was allowed to read and write. He attended Wilberforce University and attended divinity school in Hannibal, Missouri. The American Civil War broke out while he was at Wilberforce. He and 115 students from the mostly black university attempted to enlist in the Union Army but were refused.

Career
Cain worked as a barber in Galena, Illinois, and worked on steamboats along the Ohio River before he migrated south.

He had been licensed to preach for the Methodist Episcopal Church in 1844. His first assignment was in Hannibal, Missouri. In 1848, frustrated by the segregationist policies of the Methodists, he joined the African Methodist Episcopal Church, an independent black denomination started in Philadelphia. By 1859 he became a deacon in Muscatine, Iowa. In 1861, Cain was called as a pastor at the Bridge Street Church in Brooklyn, New York. In 1862, he was ordained as an elder and remained at the Brooklyn church until 1865.

After the Civil War, Cain moved to Charleston, South Carolina, in 1865 as superintendent of AME missions and presided over the Emmanuel Church in that city. The AME Church attracted tens of thousands of converts to its denomination very rapidly.

Cain became active in politics, serving as a delegate to the state constitutional convention in 1868.  He represented Charleston County in the South Carolina Senate from 1868 to 1872. He also edited the South Carolina Leader newspaper (later renamed the Missionary Record). As editor, he hired future congressmen Robert B. Elliott and Alonzo Ransier.

He was elected as a Republican to the Forty-third United States Congress in a newly created at-large district.  He was on the Committee on Agriculture, but focused more on the civil rights bill which eventually passed in diluted form in 1875. He gave noted speeches on the bill in January, 1873. He did not run for re-election in 1874 after redistricting, but ran for the 2nd district in 1876.  He was elected to the Forty-fifth United States Congress.

In 1877, while advocating in Congress for mail service to West African Colonies, Cain became a member of the Liberian Exodus Joint Stock Steamship Company. In 1880, Cain was elected and consecrated a bishop in the African Methodist Episcopal Church; he served the episcopal district which comprised Louisiana and Texas.  He helped found Paul Quinn College and served as its president until 1884.

Cain then moved to Washington, D.C., where he served as AME bishop over the Mid-Atlantic and New England States. He died in Washington on January 18, 1887, and was buried in Graceland Cemetery there, but may have been removed to Woodlawn Cemetery about a decade later, when Graceland closed and many of its interments were reburied in Woodlawn.

See also
List of African-American United States representatives
List of Native Americans in the United States Congress

References

External links
Congressional biography

1825 births
1887 deaths
19th-century American clergy
19th-century American politicians
African-American abolitionists
African-American members of the United States House of Representatives
African-American Methodists
African-American politicians during the Reconstruction Era
African-American state legislators in South Carolina
African Methodist Episcopal bishops
American Methodist clergy
American Methodist missionaries
American people of Cherokee descent
Barbers
Methodist abolitionists
Native American members of the United States Congress
Republican Party members of the United States House of Representatives from South Carolina
People from Gallipolis, Ohio
People from Greenbrier County, West Virginia
Washington, D.C., Republicans
Wilberforce University alumni
19th-century Native Americans
Burials at Woodlawn Cemetery (Washington, D.C.)